The Union Miners Cemetery is a cemetery in Mount Olive, Illinois. The cemetery is the burial site of labor leader Mary Harris "Mother" Jones, who is memorialized with a  granite monument. The monument and surrounding plaques also commemorate "General" Alexander Bradley, four victims of the Battle of Virden, and twenty-one other miners who died in labor struggles. Miners Day has been celebrated on October 12 at the cemetery since 1899. The cemetery was listed on the National Register of Historic Places on October 18, 1972.

References

Cemeteries on the National Register of Historic Places in Illinois
History of labor relations in the United States
Buildings and structures in Macoupin County, Illinois
1899 establishments in Illinois
National Register of Historic Places in Macoupin County, Illinois
Mining in Illinois
Miners' labor movement